Rudolf Bernhardt (29 April 1925 – 1 December 2021) was a German judge. He represented Germany on the European Court of Human Rights from 1981 to 1998 and served as President of the Court from 24 March to 31 October 1998.

References

1925 births
2021 deaths
People from Kassel
German judges of international courts and tribunals
Presidents of the European Court of Human Rights